Giuseppe Chirico, also known as o' Granatiere ("The Grenadier"), was an Italian boss of the Camorra, a Mafia-type organisation in Naples in Italy, at the end of the 19th century.

He hailed from the Porta San Gennaro neighbourhood in Naples and was elected capintesta (head-in-chief) of the Camorra after the death of Ciccio Cappuccio in 1892. The election process determined that the tallest among the capintriti or district bosses would become the head of the organisation. Chirico, who measured more than 1m90, became the new chief. According to journalist Vittorio Paliotti, who wrote a history of the Camorra, Chirico would go down in the history of the Camorra as the most cowardly and most timid headman that ever existed. The news of the election of the "Grenadier" to the highest position, had surprised everyone. Chirico had never been challenged or participated in a zumpata – a kind of ritual initiation knife duel. He had made a career only with diplomacy and smiles.

Although the conclave of the twelve district heads had decided in favour of Chirico, another popular leader, Antonio Palladino, known as Totonno 'o Pappagallo, with many followers, contested the election. The matter was settled in a zumpata, in which, according to one source, Chirico was killed. According to Paliotti, Chirico, due to his inexperience with weapons, was wounded at the first blow and, to save himself, threw the knife to the ground and declared himself defeated. After his win 'o Pappagallo was elected with all the votes, but had been sentenced to go to prison. Two of the twelve districts, Vicaria and Mercato, decided that his alternate, the young Enrico Alfano, would assume effective powers. After 'o Pappagallo left prison, he was defeated in yet another duel by Alfano around the turn of the century.

References

 Consiglio, Alberto (2005). La camorra a Napoli, Naples: Guida Editori, 
 Paliotti, Vittorio (2006). Storia della Camorra, Rome: Newton Compton editore, 

Year of birth missing
Year of death missing
Camorristi
Criminals from Naples
19th-century Italian criminals